The Furongian  is the fourth and final epoch and series of the Cambrian. It succeeds the Miaolingian series of the Cambrian and precedes the Lower Ordovician Tremadocian Stage. It is subdivided into three stages: the Paibian, Jiangshanian and the unnamed 10th stage of the Cambrian.

Naming
The Furongian was also known as the Cambrian Series 4, and the name replaced the older term Upper Cambrian and equivalent to the local term Hunanian. The present name was ratified by the International Commission on Stratigraphy in 2003.  means 'lotus' in Mandarin and refers to Hunan which is known as the "lotus state".

Definition
The lower boundary is defined in the same way as the GSSP of the Paibian Stage. Both begin with the first appearance of the trilobite Glyptagnostus reticulatus around  million years ago. The upper boundary is the lower boundary and GSSP of the Tremadocian Stage which is the first appearance of the conodont Iapetognathus fluctivagus around  million years ago.

Subdivisions
The following table shows the subdivisions of the Furongian series/epoch:

Biostratigraphy
The base of two of three stages of the Furongian are defined as the first appearance of a trilobite. The base of the Paibian is the first appearance of Glyptagnostus reticulatus and the base of the Jiangshanian is the first appearance of Agnostotes orientalis. The still unnamed Cambrian Stage 10 might be defined as the first appearance of Lotagnostus americanus or the conodont Eoconodontus notchpeakensis.

The Furongian can be divided into a number of trilobite zones:

References

 
04
Geological epochs